The 2000 Conference USA baseball tournament was the 2000 postseason baseball championship of the NCAA Division I Conference USA, held at Florida Power Park in St. Petersburg, Florida, from May 17 through 21. Houston defeated Cincinnati in the championship game, earning the conference's automatic bid to the 2000 NCAA Division I baseball tournament.

The tournament's format was changed slightly from the format used from 1996 to 1999. The play-in round that had been used to determine which of the lowest seeds would participate in the eight-team bracket was eliminated. Instead, only the top eight of the conference's ten teams in the regular season qualified for the tournament. The loss of the play-in round shortened the tournament from six to five days.

Regular season results 

 Records reflect conference play only.

Bracket 

 Bold indicates the winner of the game.
 Italics indicate that the team was eliminated from the tournament.

All-tournament team

References 

Tournament
Conference USA Baseball Tournament
Conference USA baseball tournament
Conference USA baseball tournament
21st century in St. Petersburg, Florida
Baseball competitions in Florida
College sports tournaments in Florida
Sports competitions in St. Petersburg, Florida